Best of Celly Cel 2: Tha Sick Wid It Dayz is the second greatest hits album by rapper, Celly Cel.  The compilation was released in 2007 for R.N.L.G. Records and was the sequel to 1999's The Best of Celly Cel.

Track listing
"Its Goin Down" (Remix) feat. Mack 10, E-40 & B-Legit- 5:36
"Bailin Thru Mu Hood" feat. B-Legit- 4:29
"What U Niggaz Thought?"- 4:47
"The Function" feat. E-40- 4:17
"Pop the Trunk" feat. UGK 4:05
"Can I Kick It" feat. Keak Da Sneak & Mugzi- 4:31
"Retalliation" feat. E-40- 5:08
"Dont Wanna See Us" feat. Messy Marv & San Quinn- 4:28
"Tha Scrilla" feat. E-40 & B-Legit- 4:12
"Skanlezz Call"- 0:44
"Skanlezz Azz Bitchez"- 5:16
"The Body Shop"- 3:18
"Heat 4 Yo Azz"- 3:55
"Its Goin Down"- 5:23
"Ride" feat. C-Bo- 3:51
"Hoe'z Luv Me"- 3:29 (previously unreleased track)

Best of Celly Cel 2: The Sick Wid It Dayz, The
2007 greatest hits albums
Gangsta rap compilation albums